Oreojuncus is a small genus of flowering plants in the rush family Juncaceae, found in the eastern United States, eastern Canada, Greenland, Iceland, the Faroes, most of Europe, northern Russia, western Siberia and the Altai. Their chromosome number is 2n=30 (x=15), whereas Juncus, from which they were split, has x=20.

Species
Currently accepted species include:

Oreojuncus monanthos (Jacq.) Záv.Drábk. & Kirschner
Oreojuncus trifidus (L.) Záv.Drábk. & Kirschner

References

Poales genera
Juncaceae